The Soul Is in the Software is the second full-length album by Icon of Coil, released in 2002.

Track listing
 "Comment" - 0:27
 "Thrillcapsule" - 6:03
 "Violations" - 4:32
 "In Absence" - 5:02
 "Access And Amplify" - 4:59
 "Everything is Real?" - 5:10
 "Other Half of Me" - 4:37
 "Love As Blood" - 5:41
 "Disconnect" - 3:53
 "Simulated" - 4:05

Credits
All songs written, produced and recorded by Icon of Coil.

2002 albums
Icon of Coil albums